PFDC Sunsilk Fashion Week is an annual fashion event held in Lahore and Karachi in Pakistan. The event is organised by the Pakistan Fashion Design Council (PFDC) along with the sponsor of Sunsilk.

2010 
1st PFDC Sunsilk Fashion Week was held on February 16–19, 2010 in Lahore.

2011 
3rd PFDC Sunsilk Fashion Week was held in 2011 in Lahore and Karachi.

2012 
5th PFDC Sunsilk Fashion Week was held in April 2012. The venue for the event was Expo Centre Lahore.

2017 
The 9th PFDC Sunsilk Fashion Week was held in March 2017. This four-day event was held in Lahore and showcased top Pakistani fashion designers In addition to this, at least four new designers were also launched in collaboration with Bank Al Falah Rising Talent Segment..

References 

PFDC Sunsilk Fashion Week 2013

External links 
 PFDC's 
 

Fashion events in Pakistan
Annual events in Pakistan
2010 establishments in Pakistan
Recurring events established in 2010
Fashion weeks